Eobroscus is a genus of beetles in the family Carabidae which was circumscribed by Oleg Leonidovich Kryzhanovsky in 1951. Its species are found in Russia, China, Korea, Japan, China,  Taiwan, Bhutan, and Vietnam. , it contains the following three species:
 Eobroscus bhutanensis Morvan, 1982
 syn. E. uenoi 
 Eobroscus lutshniki (Roubal, 1928)
 syn. E. amabilis 
 syn. E. chalybaeus 
 syn. E. richteri 
 Eobroscus masumotoi Morita, 1990

In 1990, Seiji Morita proposed the subgenus Orobroscus for the species E. bhutanensis and E. masumotoi; Morita added E. uenoi to this subgenus when it was described in 1995. In 2013, E. uenoi became synonymized with E. bhutanensis and Orobroscus with Eobroscus. The authors of this 2013 paper also said they were skeptical about the status of E. masumotoi, but tentatively kept it as a distinct species.

References

Broscinae
Carabidae genera